The enzyme 4-hydroxy-2-oxovalerate aldolase catalyzes the chemical reaction

4-hydroxy-2-oxopentanoate  acetaldehyde + pyruvate

Baker et al. showed that BphI, a member of this family from Burkholderia xenovorans LB400 was able to utilize 4-hydroxy- 2-oxohexanoate (HOHA) with equal catalytic efficiency as 4-hydroxy-2-oxopentanoate, producing propionaldehyde + pyruvate. Furthermore, the enzyme was also able to  catalyze the cleavage of 4-hydroxy-2-oxoheptanoate (HOHEP), forming butyraldehyde + pyruvate. Baker et al. we also able to show that acetaldehyde and propionaldehyde are not released into the bulk solvent, but are channeled to an associated acetaldehyde dehydrogenase known as BphJ. This is the first demonstration of substrate channeling in this family of enzymes.

This enzyme belongs to the family of lyases, specifically the oxo-acid-lyases, which cleave carbon-carbon bonds.  The systematic name of this enzyme class is 4-hydroxy-2-oxopentanoate pyruvate-lyase (acetaldehyde-forming). Other names in common use include 4-hydroxy-2-ketovalerate aldolase, HOA, DmpG, BphI, 4-hydroxy-2-oxovalerate pyruvate-lyase, and 4-hydroxy-2-oxopentanoate pyruvate-lyase.  This enzyme participates in 8 metabolic pathways: phenylalanine metabolism, benzoate degradation via hydroxylation, biphenyl degradation, toluene and xylene degradation, 1,4-dichlorobenzene degradation, fluorene degradation, carbazole degradation, and styrene degradation.

References

Further reading 

 
 
 
 

EC 4.1.3
Enzymes of unknown structure